The Grand Hotel in Big Timber, Montana, located at 139 McLeod, was built in 1890.  Its building was financed by Jacob Halverson, a Sweet Grass County sheep rancher.

It was listed on the National Register of Historic Places in 1985. It was deemed significant "as an important center for social and commercial activity in Big Timber", a wool exporting community.  A fire in 1908 destroyed most businesses along McLeod Street but not the Grand Hotel.

References

External links
The Grand Hotel, official website

Hotel buildings on the National Register of Historic Places in Montana
Hotel buildings completed in 1890
National Register of Historic Places in Sweet Grass County, Montana
1890 establishments in Montana